The 2002 Golden Globes (Portugal) were held on 7 May 2002.

Winners
Cinema:
Best Film: Je Rentre à la Maison, with Manoel de Oliveira
Best Actress: Rita Blanco, in Ganhar a Vida
Best Actor: Joaquim de Almeida, in O Xangô de Baker Street

Theatre:
Best Actress: Irene Cruz
Best Actor: João Perry
Best Peça: Amadeus, encenado por Carlos Avilez

Music:
Best Performer: João Pedro Pais
Best Group: Santamaria
Best Song: Não Há - João Pedro Pais

Television:
Best Fiction and Comedy Show Actress: Maria Rueff with O Programa da Maria and Herman SIC
Best Fiction and Comedy Show Actor: Ruy de Carvalho with Olhos de Água
Best Fiction and Comedy Show: Olhos de Água
Best Information Host: José Alberto Carvalho
Best Entertainment Host: Herman José
Best Fiction and Comedy Show: Cuidado com as Aparências
Best Entertainment Show: Herman SIC
Best Information Program: Jornal da Noite

Award of Merit and Excellence:
Agustina Bessa Luís

References

2001 film awards
2001 music awards
2001 television awards
Golden Globes (Portugal)
2002 in Portugal